Local elections were held in Sri Lanka on 8 August 2009 for two local councils in the north of the country: Jaffna Municipal Council and Vavuniya Urban Council. They were the first elections held in the country since the government declared victory in the 26-year-old civil war on 18 May 2009. They were also the first local elections held in the Northern Province in more than 11 years. Both towns had been under government control for many years. The government won the Jaffna Municipal Council contest by securing 13 of the 23 seats. The Tamil National Alliance (TNA) won the Vavuniya Urban Council contest by securing 5 of the 11 seats. Turnout was very low in Jaffna (22%) but it was better in Vavuniya (52%).

Background
On 25 May 2009 the government announced that local elections would be held in Jaffna and Vavuniya. Nominations took place between 18 June 2009 and 25 June 2009. After the nominations closed the Sri Lankan Department of Election announced that the elections would take place on 8 August 2009, the same day as the Uva Provincial Council elections.

The TNA has said that the elections are being held too early, with so many of the electorate displaced. It expected the Jaffna elections to be violent and the results to be rigged, just like the 2008 Eastern Provincial Council elections. The United National Party (UNP) and the People's Action for Free and Fair Election (PAFFREL) have called on the election authorities to bring in foreign election observers.

Violence, intimidation and other irregularities
Veerasingham Anandasangaree, president of the Tamil United Liberation Front (TULF), has accused a Tamil government minister of "terrorising the residents of Jaffna in the run-up to the Municipal Council elections". It is believed that the minister Anandasangaree was referring to is Douglas Devananda, leader of the paramilitary Eelam People's Democratic Party (EPDP).

The UNP has accused the government of obstructing the UNP's campaign in Jaffna and Vavuniya. It says the government is preventing its free movement and has complained to the Election Department. The UNP has also accused armed supporters of the EPDP of threatening its candidates. It has said that the EPDP is using state resources, such as the police, in its election campaigns.

In the early hours of 25 June 2009 armed men attacked newspaper delivery men and burnt thousands of copies of three Tamil language newspapers (Thinakkural, Uthayan and Valampuri) in Jaffna. The newspapers had refused to print a statement attacking the Tamil Tigers from a shadowy group calling itself the "Tamil Front Protecting the Country". The group telephoned the Thinakkural after the attack and warned that the newspapers would continue to be confiscated and torched until the statement was published. The newspaper published the statement under duress on 26 June 2009.

On 27 June 2009 the group issued further threats against the Uthayan, this time ordering all its staff to resign by 30 June 2009 or face death.

On 4 July 2009 two men were shot and killed by unidentified gunmen in the Parathipuram area of Vavuniya. The dead men were identified as 39-year-old Nadaraja Ramesh Kantha, principal of Parathipuram Tamil Mixed School, and 31-year-old Gunarathnam Peter Ruben.

Jaffna Municipal Council
The last election for Jaffna MC was held on 29 January 1998.

The following six alliances / parties / independent groups' nominations were accepted by the Sri Lankan Department of Election:
 Tamil National Alliance
 Tamil United Liberation Front
 United National Party
 United People's Freedom Alliance
 Independent Group 1 (displaced Muslims)
 Independent Group 2 (Abimanasingham Manickasothy)

A total of 174 candidates competed for the 23 seats available on the council.

The nominations of the Sri Lanka Muslim Congress (SLMC) and an independent group (Arumugam Sellathurai) were rejected by the Sri Lankan Department of Election. The SLMC appealed to the Supreme Court of Sri Lanka but on 3 July the courts rejected the appeal. There were approximately 10,000 Muslim refugees from Jaffna living in other districts. Of these 7,104 applied to vote in the Jaffna elections. With the elimination of the SLMC and the UNP not fielding any Muslim candidates, most of the Muslims would most likely have voted for the United People's Freedom Alliance.

Extraordinarily there were no applications by Tamil refugees to vote in the Jaffna elections. There are hundreds of thousands of Tamil refugees from the Jaffna peninsula living in other parts of the country, either in refugee camps or with relatives. Many of these are from the Jaffna municipality area.

Veteran politician Veerasingham Anandasangaree is a candidate to become Mayor of Jaffna. Anandasangaree was a TNA Member of Parliament but left the TNA when it started taking a pro-Tamil Tiger stance. Since then he has reconstituted the TULF, a constituent party of the TNA, as a separate political party and formed alliances with government-backed anti-Tamil Tigers paramilitary groups, such as the People's Liberation Organisation of Tamil Eelam (PLOTE), in order to fight elections against the TNA. Most TULF members however remain within the TNA.

Results
The government (UPFA) took control of the Jaffna Municipal Council after securing 13 of the 23 seats.

The following candidates were elected:

The EPDP has nominated Patkunam Yogeswary to be Mayor and Thurairajah Illango to be Deputy Mayor.

Vavuniya Urban Council
The last election for Vavuniya UC was held on 1 March 1994.

The following nine alliances / parties / independent groups' nominations were accepted by the Sri Lankan Department of Election:
 Democratic People's Liberation Front
 Sri Lanka Muslim Congress
 Sri Lanka Progressive Front
 Tamil National Alliance
 United National Party
 United People's Freedom Alliance
 Independent Group 1
 Independent Group 2
 Independent Group 3

A total of 135 candidates competed for the 11 seats available on the council.

The TULF (Anandasangaree wing) filed a separate nomination but this was rejected by the Sri Lankan Department of Election.

Results
The Tamil National Alliance (TNA) secured 5 of the 11 seats, making it the largest group on Vavuniya Urban Council. The TNA is seeking SLMC support to form a majority administration. The TNA's victory in Vavuniya was seen as a surprise by international observers because many people had predicted the end of the TNA following the LTTE's military defeat.

The following candidates were elected:

The TNA has nominated S. N. G. Nathan to be Chairman and Muttu Sivasami Muguntharathan to be Deputy Mayor.

References

2009
2009 elections in Asia
2009 in Sri Lanka
Jaffna Municipal Council
August 2009 events in Asia